The Niger national rugby union team represents Niger in international rugby union. Niger are a member of the International Rugby Board (IRB), and have yet to play in a Rugby World Cup tournament. Niger were the runner up to  Tanzania in the CAR Castel Beer Trophy in 2006, but won the northern section.

Record

Overall

External links
Tanzania win CAR Castel Cup
Niger International Data

African national rugby union teams
Rugby union in Niger
R